John W. Hirons (1876 – after 1905) was an English professional footballer who played in the Football League for Small Heath.

Hirons was born in the Erdington district of Birmingham. He played local football before moving up to the Midland League with Walsall and in February 1903 joined Small Heath of the Second Division. He was signed as cover for regular winger Oakey Field, and made his debut on 21 February 1903 deputising for Field in a game at Burton United which Small Heath won 1–0. Hirons played twice more in the 1902–03 season, and played a further two games the following year in the First Division. Though a hard worker, it was felt he did not have the ability for top-level football, and he returned to Walsall in 1906.

References

1876 births
Year of death missing
Footballers from Birmingham, West Midlands
English footballers
Association football wingers
Walsall F.C. players
Birmingham City F.C. players
English Football League players
Date of birth missing
Place of death missing